Dorset is an unincorporated community in central Dorset Township, Ashtabula County, Ohio, United States.  It has a post office with the ZIP code 44032.  It lies along State Route 193.

Dorset was originally named Millsford, and under the latter name was founded in 1828. The present name is after Dorset, Vermont, the native home of an early settler.

John Brown Junior, son of John Brown the abolitionist, lived in Dorset from approximately 1855 to 1885.

References

Unincorporated communities in Ohio
Unincorporated communities in Ashtabula County, Ohio
1828 establishments in Ohio
Populated places established in 1828